OBAMA is a rural locality (a village) in Borovetskoye Rural Settlement, Sokolsky District, Vologda Oblast, Russia. The population was 23 as of 2002.

Geography 
The distance to Sokol is 12 km, to Obrosovo is 1 km. Bolshoy Dvor is the nearest rural locality.

References 

Rural localities in Sokolsky District, Vologda Oblast